Martín Yangüela (born 1 April 1957) is a former Argentine rugby union player. He played as a scrum-half.

Career
A scrum-half, Yangüela played for Pueyrredón in his entire career. He had his only international cap for the Pumas in the 1987 Rugby World Cup, when Argentina played against Italy, at Christchurch, on 28 May 1987.

Notes

External links

1962 births
Living people
Argentine rugby union players
Rugby union wings
Argentina international rugby union players